Rijeka city derby, is the name given to matches between HNK Rijeka and HNK Orijent 1919, the two most popular football clubs in the Adriatic city of Rijeka.

The rivalry dates back to the time when the western part of the city, Fiume, was part of the Kingdom of Italy and the eastern part of the city, Sušak, part of the Kingdom of Yugoslavia. Between 1932 and 1940, U.S. Fiumana and NK Orijent played 10 games, with Fiumana winning nine times and Orijent on one occasion.

Numerous derbies were contested after World War II, particularly when both clubs competed in the Yugoslav Second League between 1969 and 1973. The last league derby took place during the 1996–97 Croatian First Football League season, the only season in which Orijent played in the same tier as Rijeka since 1972–73.

List of matches
The two clubs have played 14 official league matches and close to 10 official cup fixtures. In addition, they have played more than 70 friendly matches. Out of 14 league meetings, Rijeka won 11 and Orijent won 1 match, with 2 draws. The list below documents those games for which data can be found, which includes all league games and some cup games. The list will be updated as more data is sourced.

Key

Matches

Source: Marinko Lazzarich, Kantrida Bijelih Snova, Rijeka: Adamić, 2008.

References

External links
 HNK Rijeka  
 HNK Orijent 1919  

HNK Orijent
Football derbies in Croatia
derby
Sport in Rijeka